The 1938 NCAA Track and Field Championships was the 17th NCAA track and field championship.  The event was held at the University of Minnesota's Memorial Stadium in June 1938.  The University of Southern California won its fourth consecutive team title, and new NCAA records were established in the 120-yard high hurdles, one-mile run, two-mile run and high jump.

Team results

Track events
100-yard dash  
1. Mozel Ellerbee, Tuskegee - 9.7 seconds
2. Adrian Talley, USC
3. Ben Johnson, Columbia 
5. William Clifford, Notre Dame

120-yard high hurdles
1. Fred Wolcott, Rice - 14.1 seconds
2. Dick Kearns, Colorado
3. Elmer Gedeon, Michigan

220-yard dash 
1. Mack Robinson, Oregon - 21.3 seconds
2. Ray Malott, Stanford
3. Jack Emigh, Montana 

220-yard low hurdles 
1. Fred Wolcott, Rice - 23.3 seconds
2. Earl Vickery, USC
3. Harvey Woodstra, Michigan State

440-yard dash 
1. Ray Malott, Stanford - 46.8 seconds
2. E. Miller, USC
3. H. Bachman, USC

880-yard run 
1. John Woodruff, Pitt
2. John Francis, Notre Dame
3. John Marion, Prairieview Teachers

One-mile run 
1. Louis Zamperini, USC - 4:08.3 (NCAA record)
2. Charles Fenske, Wisconsin

Two-mile run 
1. Walter Mehl, Wisconsin - 9:11.1 (NCAA record)
2. Gregg Rice, Notre Dame
3. Richard Frey, Michigan State

Field events

Broad jump 
1. Bill Lacefield, UCLA - 25 feet, 1⅛ inches
2. William Watson, Michigan - 24 feet, 11½ inches
3. Charles Walker, Ohio State - 24 feet, 9½ inches

High jump 
1. David Albritton, Ohio State - 6 feet, 8¾ inches (NCAA record)
1. Gil Cruter, Colorado - 6 feet, 8¾ inches (NCAA record) 
3. Ed Burke, Marquette
3. Wesley Alten, Michigan
3. Delos Thurber, USC
3. Lloyd Thompson, Xavier

Pole vault 
1. Loring Day, USC - 14 feet, 2 inches
2. Irving Howe, USC
2. Milt Padway, Wisconsin
2. George Varofr, Oregon

Discus throw 
1. Pete Zagar, Stanford - 162 feet, 3¼ inches
2. Hugh Gribben, Stanford - 155 feet, 2½ inches
3. Bill Faymonville, Notre Dame - 155 feet, 1 inch

Javelin 
1. Nick Vukmanle, Penn State - 215 feet, 8¼ inches
2. Larry Bell, Miami (Ohio) - 208 feet, 7¾ inches
3. Gillam Graham, Texas - 205 feet, 4¼ inches

Shot put 
1. Elmer Hackney, Kansas State - 51 feet, 8½ inches
2. Francis Ryan, Columbia - 51 feet, 5¼ inches
3. William Watson, Michigan - 51 feet, 3⅜ inches

See also
 NCAA Men's Outdoor Track and Field Championship

References

NCAA Men's Outdoor Track and Field Championship